Petterson Novaes Reis (born on 4 January 2004), commonly known as just Petterson or Petterson Novaes, is a Brazilian professional footballer who plays as a forward. He currently plays for Flamengo.

Club career
Petterson began his career with Flamengo and made his professional debut for the club on 26 January 2022 against Portuguesa da Ilha. He came on as a 92nd minute substitute for Thiago Fernandes as Flamengo win the match 2–1.

Career statistics

References

External links

2004 births
Living people
Brazilian footballers
Association football forwards
Campeonato Brasileiro Série A players
CR Flamengo footballers